Louis Maimbourg (January 10, 1610, Nancy – August 13, 1686, Paris)  was a French Jesuit and historian.

Biography
Born at Nancy, Maimbourg entered the Society of Jesus at the age of sixteen, and after studying at Rome became a classical master in the Jesuit college at Rouen. He afterwards devoted himself to preaching, but with only moderate success. After having taken some part in minor controversies he threw himself with energy into the dispute which had arisen as to the Gallican liberties; for his Traité historique de l'établissement et des prérogatives de l'Eglise de Rome et de ses évêques (1682) he was by command of Innocent XI expelled from the Society, but rewarded by Louis XIV with a residence at the abbey of St Victor, Paris, and a pension.

Works
His numerous works include histories of Arianism, the iconoclast controversy, the Great Schism of 1054, Lutheranism, Anglicanism, Calvinism, and of the pontificates of Leo I and Gregory I. These works are compilations, written in a very lively and attractive style, but noted for their inaccuracies. His work on the Crusades, Histoire des Croisades pour la délivrance de la Terre Sainte (1675), was a populist and royalist history of the Crusades from 1195 to 1220, and is regarded as the first use of the term "crusade".  It was translated into English in 1684 by historian John Nalson.His Histoire du calvinisme (1682) agitated French Catholics against French Protestants, provoking a ferocious response from Pierre Jurieu (1683) and a calm demolition of his historical method by Pierre Bayle in his Critique général de l’histoire du calvinisme de Maimbourg (1682).

Notes

References

External links
The History of the League 1684 by Louis Maimbourg, translated by John Dryden
 The History of Arianism translated (1728) Vol 1
The History of Arianism translated (1728) Vol2
Louis Maimbourg in the Historical Archives of the Pontifical Gregorian University

17th-century French historians
Historians of the Crusades
17th-century French Jesuits
Clergy from Nancy, France
1610 births
1686 deaths
French male non-fiction writers
Writers from Nancy, France